The 2019 Pakistan Cup was the fourth edition of the Pakistan Cup, a List A cricket competition which was contested between five teams. It was held from 2 to 12 April 2019, with all the matches played at the Rawalpindi Cricket Stadium. The Pakistan Cricket Board (PCB) stated that the top performers in the tournament would be considered for the 2019 Cricket World Cup in England.

Federal Areas were the defending champions, but they lost their first three matches of the tournament, therefore eliminating them from competition. On 9 April 2019, Khyber Pakhtunkhwa beat Sindh by nine runs to advance to the final of the tournament. The result meant that Baluchistan also progressed to the final, regardless of the outcome of their last match against Federal Areas. Khyber Pakhtunkhwa won the tournament, to win their second title, after beating Balochistan by nine runs in the final.

Squads
Prior to the start of the tournament, the PCB named the following squads:

Group stage

Points table

 Teams qualified for the final

Fixtures
The fixtures were confirmed by the PCB:

Final

References

External links
 Series home at ESPN Cricino

2019 in Pakistani cricket
2019 in Punjab, Pakistan
April 2019 sports events in Pakistan
21st century in Rawalpindi
Cricket in Rawalpindi
2019